State Highway 23 (SH 23) is a New Zealand state highway that connects the towns of Raglan and Hamilton.

Route 
It travels west down Massey Street, changing to Whatawhata Road after a six-leg roundabout in the suburb of Dinsdale. After exiting Hamilton, and reaching the town of Whatawhata it shares a brief concurrency of the north–south  and crosses the Waipā River. It then continues west over the summit to the Waitetuna valley, through Te Uku and over tributaries of the Whaingaroa Harbour until reaching Raglan.

Traffic flows 

Average annual daily traffic records taken by the NZ Transport Agency measures the volume of traffic is measured at roughly 13,000 vehicles per day near the eastern terminus while at km 32 closer to Raglan the AADT is measured at roughly 4500 vehicles per day. SH 23 is classified by the NZTA as a primary collector highway as per the One Network Road Classification.

Traffic roughly quadrupled over the period 1975 to 2018, as shown in this table and the graph derived from it.

Route changes 
When SH 1 used to run through the Hamilton CBD, SH 23 began at the intersection of Mill Street and Ulster Street. When SH 1 was diverted westwards away from the CBD SH 23 was shortened to where its eastern terminus currently lies. In July 2022, upon opening of the Hamilton section of the Waikato Expressway, SH 1 moved from its location through Lincoln and Greenwood Streets onto the expressway. The old designation of SH 1 through Hamilton was renumbered SH 1C.

Speed limits 
 limits apply at Whatawhata (extended westwards in 2012) and Te Uku (introduced in 2012).

Safety 
In the decade to 2016 there were 10 deaths and 64 serious injuries on SH23. 30% hit a roadside hazard, 40% hit an oncoming vehicle, 25% were at junctions, 47% involved alcohol and 48% driving too fast. Work by the Safe Roads Alliance in 2016/17 on 2 of the 3 sections of road is estimated to cost $13.2m.

Public transport 
A public bus service which traverses the length of SH 23 is provided by Waikato Regional Council.

History
The road was gazetted a State Highway in 1961. In the same year tar-sealing of the road was completed. Prior to that, metalling had been completed in 1921.

Until 1863 the route was only passable on foot. By 1864, as part of the invasion of the Waikato, about six bridges were built to make it passable for pack horses. Conversion to a road began in 1878 and the first stage coach ran in March 1880, though the bridge over the Waipa wasn't started until late in 1880. Metalling of the road began after a poll in 1907 and deviations were built to shorten the route, including that over the summit, bypassing what is now Old Mountain Road, which was passable by 1912.

Major intersections

See also
 List of New Zealand state highways

References

External links

 New Zealand Transport Agency
NZTA Highway Information Sheets (speed limits, widths, seal type, etc.) –
 Raglan-SH23
 SH23-foot of deviation
 foot of deviation-Karakariki
 Karakariki-Whatawhata
 Whatawhata-Hamilton
 1924 gradient profile and diagram of main junctions (to read this, download the whole file using the download link in the menu bar at the top, or use the same menu bar to increase magnification to Level 5 and use the navigation arrows to scroll down just over half way on the left hand side, or go to the Facebook link)

23
Transport in Waikato
Waikato District